The Arkansas-class ironclads were a class of two casemate ironclads ordered by the Confederate States Navy in 1861 to operate in the Western and Trans-Mississippi theaters of the American Civil War.

Ships

Notes

References

Bibliography
 
 
 
 

 

 
Ironclad classes
Ironclad warships of the Confederate States Navy